was a Japanese Minister of Justice. He was a pro-death penalty activist and approved the executions of 33 people, including Matsuo Fujimoto and Ri Chin'u, who became the basis for the film  Death by Hanging. On September 11, 1962, he commanded Fujimoto's execution and he was executed three days after. He also attempted to execute Sadamichi Hirasawa, but failed. Hirasawa was not executed, and died on May 10, 1987.

References

|-

1911 births
1987 deaths
Ministers of Justice of Japan